{{safesubst:#invoke:RfD|||month = March
|day = 11
|year = 2023
|time = 15:27
|timestamp = 20230311152747

|content=
REDIRECT Unit prefix#Unofficial prefixes

}}